The 2004 Green Flag MSA British Touring Car Championship season was the 47th British Touring Car Championship (BTCC) season.

Changes for 2004

Teams and drivers
With the admittance of Super 2000-spec cars into the championship, the BTCC welcomed with it a new manufacturer, with SEAT Sport's UK division entering a pair of Toledos identical to those used in the European Touring Car Championship, run by RML.  At the wheel were Jason Plato, returning to the championship for the first time since his title victory in 2001, and youngster Rob Huff, who earned his drive through winning the inaugural SEAT Cupra UK Championship, for which Plato had acted as a driver coach.

They were joined by reigning champions of the last three seasons Vauxhall, with Triple 8 Engineering again running a trio of Astra Coupes. 2003 champion Yvan Muller remained along with runner-up and 2002 title winner James Thompson, with Luke Hines replacing Paul O'Neill in the third car on the back of claiming the Production class title in his debut season the previous year.

Honda cut its Arena Motorsport-run Civic Type-R campaign down to a single car for the returning Tom Chilton, but the Civic challenge was augmented by a pair of cars entered by Team Dynamics for Matt Neal, returning to his family team from the works Honda set-up, and Dan Eaves, who brought with him Halfords sponsorship after the withdrawal of Vic Lee Racing.  Proton completed the line-up of works teams, its two Impians now driven by two newcomers to British motorsport; the experienced South African Shaun Watson-Smith and the young Malaysian Farique Hairuman.

Financial trouble forced MG Rover to pull its works backing from West Surrey Racing's MG ZS assault, but the team cut down from three to two cars and returned as an independent with young gun Colin Turkington and veteran Anthony Reid staying on board.

Ex-works Vauxhall Astra Coupes were a popular choice amongst the other independents, with Michael Bentwood stepping up from the Production ranks in a 'VXR Junior' team prepared by Tech-Speed Motorsport and 2003 Independents champion Rob Collard continuing to campaign an Astra for his self-run team.

GA Motorsport (now under the 'Team Sureterm' banner) continued to run a pair of Astra Coupes for the returning Paul Wallace and Renault Clio Cup graduate Charlie Butler-Henderson, while a Super 2000-spec Alfa Romeo 156 was also entered for Carl Breeze.  Wallace was soon replaced by experienced former Ford and Volvo factory driver Kelvin Burt, then later Irishman Gavin Smith and Stefan Hodgetts (son of ex-BTCC champion Chris), the latter then stepping in to replace Butler-Henderson when his funds ran out.  Hodgetts then swapped cars with Breeze, who himself was replaced by Gavin Pyper for the final round.

Synchro Motorsport again returned with an ex-works Honda Civic Type R for former works driver James Kaye. Jason Hughes stepped up from the Production class, racing an ex-WSR MG ZS for his Kartworld Racing team, and John Batchelor's 'Team Varta' also switched classes, running Richard Marsh from the second round onwards in first a Super 2000 Civic Type-R, then later an ex-Vic Lee Racing Peugeot 307.  Marsh was replaced by Jay Wheals for the final round, for which the team returned to the Civic.

Mardi Gras Motorsport had an abortive campaign, entering a Super 2000 Civic and later an ex-works Peugeot 406 Coupe, both LPG-powered, for businessman John George, and Edenbridge Racing briefly entered a Super 2000 BMW 320i for Justin Keen.

Other changes
 The number of total races was increased from 20 to 30 by holding three races at each meeting instead of two
 The grid for the second race of each meeting was decided by the results of the first but with the top ten reversed; the grid for the third race was simply the finishing order of the second race
 Cars built to Super 2000 specification were allowed, with an equivalency formula designed to ensure that they would have similar performance to their BTC Spec counterparts
 Points penalties for engine changes now apply only to the team, not the driver
 The "production class" and its associated championship was abolished

Teams and drivers

Season Calendar
All races were held in the United Kingdom (excepting Mondello Park round that held in Ireland).

Drivers Championship

No driver may collect more than one "Lead a Lap" point per race no matter how many laps they lead.
Race 1 polesitter receives 1 point.

(key)

Note: bold signifies pole position (1 point given in first race only, driver who finishes 10th in first race gets pole for race 2 and race 3 pole is for race 2 winner), italics signifies fastest lap (1 point given all races) and * signifies at least one lap in the lead (1 point given all races).

Manufacturers Championship

Teams Championship

Independents Championship

External links

2004 Season
Touring Car Championship season